Lepistemonopsis is a monotypic genus of flowering plants belonging to the family Convolvulaceae. The only species is Lepistemonopsis volkensii.

Its native range is Northeastern and Eastern Tropical Africa.

References

Convolvulaceae
Monotypic Convolvulaceae genera
Taxa named by Carl Lebrecht Udo Dammer